Rogério de Almeida Florindo dos Santos (born 24 August 1987 in Araras) is a Brazilian footballer who plays for FBK Kaunas.

Rogério played for clubs in São Paulo state except followed Roma moved to Paraná state.

External links
http://200.159.15.35/registro/registro.aspx?s=183139

1987 births
Living people
Brazilian footballers
Brazilian expatriate footballers
Ituano FC players
FBK Kaunas footballers
Expatriate footballers in Lithuania
Association football midfielders
Footballers from São Paulo (state)